WFTA (101.9 FM), known as "Supertalk Mississippi", is a talk radio station based in Fulton, Mississippi that serves Tupelo and Northeast Mississippi with an ERP of 50,000 watts. WFTA is owned by Stephen C. Davenport, through licensee Telesouth Communications Inc. On-air shows include Bop's Sing-A-Long in the morning with Craig Horton.

On June 1, 2019, WFTA changed their format from classic rock to talk, branded as "SuperTalk Mississippi".

Previous logo

References

External links

FTA
News and talk radio stations in the United States